The following is a table of songs recorded by Tom Petty and the Heartbreakers.

List

Notes

References

Heartbreakers, Tom Petty and the